The 2008–09 PBA Philippine Cup Finals was the best-of-7  championship series of the 2008–09 PBA Philippine Cup and the conclusion of the conference's playoffs. The Alaska Aces and the Talk 'N Text Tropang Texters played for the 96th championship contested by the league.

This was the first Philippine Cup Finals where no team from the San Miguel Corporation took part since 2000, and the second time the Aces and the Tropang Texters met in the finals, the first was from the 2007 PBA Fiesta Conference in which the Aces won in seven games.

Background

Series summary

Game 1

Game 2

Game 3

Game 4

Game 5

Conference best player Willie Miller knocked in a big triple to make up for two crucial errors down the stretch. TNT had a chance to salvage the game but Renren Ritualo misfired his own three-point try then Harvey Carey missed a tip-in in the last eight seconds.

Game 6

Game 7

Rosters

{| class="toccolours" style="font-size: 95%;"
|-
! colspan="2" style="background-color: #000000; text-align: center;"|Alaska Aces roster
|- style="background-color: #e80006; color: white; text-align: center;"
! Players !! Coaches
|- 
| valign="top" |
{| class="sortable" style="background:transparent; margin:0px; width:100%;"
! Pos. !! # !! POB  !! Name !! Ht. !! Wt. !! From
|-

{| class="toccolours" style="font-size: 95%;"
|-
! colspan="2" style="background-color:#0055af; text-align: center;"|Talk 'N Text Tropang Texters roster
|- style="background-color: #fdd501; color: #0055af; text-align: center;"
! Players !! Coaches
|- 
| valign="top" |
{| class="sortable" style="background:transparent; margin:0px; width:100%;"
! Pos. !! # !! POB  !! Name !! Ht. !! Wt. !! From
|-

Broadcast notes
*Magoo Marjon Alternate for Ed Picson who mistakenly went to the Araneta Coliseum instead of the Cuneta Astrodome which was the Game 5 venue.

Music used in the coverage were "We Made It" by Busta Rhymes featuring Linkin Park.

References

External links
PBA official website

2009
2008–09 PBA season
Alaska Aces (PBA) games
TNT Tropang Giga games
PBA Philippine Cup Finals
PBA Philippine Cup Finals